16th Street is a side platformed Sacramento RT Light Rail station in Downtown Sacramento, California, United States. The station was opened on September 5, 1987, and is operated by the Sacramento Regional Transit District.  Located at 16th Street between Q and R Streets (in an alley), it is served by the Gold and Blue Lines and is the easternmost station where transfers can be made between both rail lines.  With a daily average of 7,100 riders, the 16th Street station is the busiest in the RT light rail system.

Platforms and tracks

References

Sacramento Regional Transit light rail stations
Railway stations in the United States opened in 1987